PEBL may mean or refer to:

 PEBL (software), Psychology Experiment Building Language, a platform for administering psychological exams
 Motorola Pebl, a mobile phone produced by Motorola.